Lawrence A. "Larry" Keefe (born December 30, 1961) is an American attorney who served as the United States Attorney for the Northern District of Florida from 2019 to 2021.

Early life and education 
Keefe was born on December 30, 1961, in Fort Dix, New Jersey. He graduated with honors from the University of Florida in 1983 and received his Juris Doctor from the Fredric G. Levin College of Law in 1986.

Legal career 
Keefe worked as a trial lawyer for more than 30 years, during which time he tried criminal and civil cases in federal and state courts. Before taking office as U.S. Attorney, he was a partner in the Fort Walton Beach, Florida-based law firm of Keefe, Anchors & Gordon. He has served on the board of trustees of the Fredric G. Levin College of Law, on the editorial board of the Florida Bar Journal, on the executive council of the trial lawyers section of the Florida Bar, and as Special Counsel to the Florida Senate Select Committee on Property Insurance Accountability.

Memberships 
Keefe is the chairperson of the Military Academy Selection Board for the First Congressional District of Florida and a past president of Catholic Charities of Northwest Florida.

United States Attorney 
On August 16, 2018, President Donald Trump nominated Keefe to be the United States Attorney for the Northern District of Florida. Keefe's nomination was sent to the United States Senate on August 27.

The Senate confirmed Keefe's nomination by voice vote on January 2, 2019. Keefe was sworn in as U.S. Attorney on January 9, 2019.

On February 8, 2021, he along with 55 other Trump-era attorneys were asked to resign. He resigned on February 28, 2021.

Florida "public safety czar"
On September 28, 2021, Florida Governor Ron DeSantis appointed Keefe as Florida's "public safety czar."

References

External links
 Biography at Justice.gov

1961 births
Living people
20th-century American lawyers
21st-century American lawyers
Florida lawyers
People from Burlington County, New Jersey
University of Florida alumni
Fredric G. Levin College of Law alumni
United States Attorneys for the Northern District of Florida